The golden-backed tree rat (Mesembriomys macrurus) is a species of rodent in the family Muridae, found only in Australia.

It is present in the Charnley River–Artesian Range Wildlife Sanctuary in the Kimberley region of Western Australia.

They range in size from 18 to 34 cm, weighing 200-330 grams.

References

Mesembriomys
Mammals of Western Australia
Mammals of the Northern Territory
Rodents of Australia
Vulnerable fauna of Australia
Mammals described in 1876
Taxonomy articles created by Polbot
Taxa named by Wilhelm Peters